The Commonwealth Boxing Council (CBC) is a governing body that sanctions professional boxing bouts for territories within the Commonwealth, and is an affiliate of the WBC.

History
The Commonwealth Boxing Council first started in 1954 as the Empire and Commonwealth Championships Committee, formed by the British Boxing Board of Control, to officially award a Commonwealth title. Before its formation, boxers from select territories within the British Empire fought for the 'Empire title', the first of such titles being awarded to British featherweight champion Jim Driscoll in 1908 after defeating Australian Charlie Griffin on points. In 1972, the Empire and Commonwealth Championships Committee was re-organised as the 'Commonwealth Championships Committee'. In 1997 the organisation was incorporated as a separate entity from the British Boxing Board of Control and renamed the Commonwealth Boxing Council.

In 2018, the first female version of the Commonwealth title was awarded to Anisha Basheel of Malawi on 15 June.

Current champions
As of 28 November 2022

Male

Female

Member organisations
Ghana Boxing Authority
Kenya Professional Boxing
Professional Boxing Control Board (Namibia)
Nigeria Boxing Board of Control
Boxing South Africa
Uganda Professional Boxing Commission
Tanzania Professional Boxing
Zambia Professional Boxing and Wrestling Control Board
Indian Boxing Council
Australian National Boxing Federation
New Zealand Professional Boxing Association
Bahamas Boxing Commission
Professional Boxing Association (Barbados)
Guyana Boxing Board of Control
Jamaica Boxing Board of Control
Trinidad and Tobago Boxing Board
British Boxing Board of Control
National Championships Committee (Canada)

See also

 List of Commonwealth Boxing Council champions
List of Commonwealth Boxing Council female champions
 List of boxing organisations

References

Professional boxing organizations
Sports organizations established in 1954
1954 establishments in the United Kingdom
International sports organizations